Grand Ayatollah Mohammad Reza Nekoonam (Persian: آیت الله محمد رضا نکونام) Iranian Twelver Shi'a Clergy.

Life
Ayatollah Mohammad Reza Nekoonam (Persian: آیت الله محمد رضا نکونام) Iranian Twelver Shi'a Clergy, was born into the physical realm in a family with heavenly attractions and great spiritual states in Golpaygan on January 9, 1949. Since he was three, he was taught by spiritual teachers and distinguished masters of various fields, particularly, Islamic mysticism. Most of them used to live in Tehran and have been the top scholars of Iran.

Arrest
On 1 January 2015, Nekoonam was arrested and given a five-year prison sentence after he defended high-speed internet and called for greater internet freedoms in September 2014. He suffered a stroke while in prison.

On 16 September 2017, Nekoonam was sentenced to 5 years in prison and was stripped of his priesthood.

Teaching experiences
Ayatollah Nekoonam has been teaching over 40 years at Qom Seminary. Some of the main areas where he has written many books on include fiqh (advanced Islamic jurisprudence), usul (advanced Islamic principles), Islamic mysticism, philosophy, moral philosophy, sociology, economics, history, politics, psychology, law, studies of angels and jinn, dream interpretation, poetry, music, women, seminaries, medicine, Koranic exegesis, etymology, etc.

Publication
Ayatollah Nekoonam  has started writing since childhood. “What Do Literalists (Ikhbari) and Principlists (Usuli) Say?” which caught distinguished scholars’ attention at that time was the first book he wrote at the age of 11. So far, he has published 800 books 200 of which have already been published in Persian and Arabic. The rest are in print. Furthermore, a selection of his works are under translation into English.

Some of his works are as follows
Islamic Catechism (2 vols), Fiqh-written of Singing and Music (10 vols), Medicinal Law, Women; Ever-oppressed of History (4 vols), 30 other books on women-related issues, Dream Interpretation (5 vols), Newly established Law (2 vols), Koranic Exegesis (50 vols), the Red Travel (20 vols) and his poetic book (15 vols) comprising over 30000 lines and...

Teachers
Ayatollah Mohammad Reza Golpaygani, Mohammad Ali Araki, sheykh morteza haere, mirza hashem amoli, seyyed ahmad khansari, milani, adib neyshabori, allameh tabatabai, allameh sha'rani, allameh elahiye qomshei.

References

External links
 Biography in Persian
 www.nekoonam.ir

1949 births
Living people
Iranian ayatollahs
Iranian Islamists
Iranian Shia clerics sentenced to deposition by the Special Clerical Court
People from Golpayegan
Shia Islamists